The Landlord and Tenant (Covenants) Act 1995 (c 30) is an Act of the Parliament of the United Kingdom.

See also
Landlord and Tenant Act

References
Halsbury's Statutes,

External links
The Landlord and Tenant (Covenants) Act 1995, as amended from the National Archives.
The Landlord and Tenant (Covenants) Act 1995, as originally enacted from the National Archives.

United Kingdom Acts of Parliament 1995
Landlord–tenant law